The Scottish Child Abuse Inquiry was established in October 2015 to inquire into cases of abuse of children in care in Scotland. It was to report and make recommendations within four years by 2019. But this deadline was later changed to "as soon as reasonably practicable". Concerns have been raised about mounting costs and delays in the Inquiry. Six years after the start of the on-going Inquiry and long after the original deadline, Lady Smith released a report which was critical of the previous Scottish Government for the 'woeful and avoidable' delay in setting up the Inquiry.

The media contact for the Scottish Child Abuse Inquiry is being managed by a PR firm called 3x1 Public Relations at a cost unknown.

The solicitor to the Scottish Child Abuse Inquiry is Andrea Summers who was previously solicitor to the Penrose Inquiry which was significantly delayed running for six years and branded by the victims to be a "total whitewash".

Inquiry Team 

Supreme Courts of Scotland judge Lady Smith was appointed as chairwoman of the inquiry in July 2016. She is supported by a Secretariat ream, a legal team and Legal Council. The Solicitor for the Inquiry is Andrea Summers and is seconded from the Scottish Government to work in the Inquiry. Ms Summers was previously the Solicitor for the Penrose Inquiry. The Penrose Inquiry took six years and the victims branded it a "total whitewash".

Prior to the appointment of Lady Smith, the Inquiry had a chair, Susan O'Brien QC, and two panel members, Michael Lamb and Glen Houston. Mr Lamb resigned because of the Scottish Government continued interference.

Phases of Inquiry 

By 2022 the inquiry was on its seventh phase. These phases were: (1) Opening statements and timetable (2) Residential child care establishments run by Catholic Orders (3) Residential child care establishments run by non-religious and voluntary organisations (4) Residential child care establishments run by male religious orders within the Roman Catholic Church (5)  Child migrants - Abuse of children whose departure from Scotland to countries such as Canada, Australia and New Zealand was part of the child migration programmes (6)  Boarding Schools and (7) Foster Care Case Study.

The Inquiry investigated over 100 locations of over 50 residential care establishments for children where there were child abuse claims. Between 2018 and 2021 the Inquiry issued several reports including four case reports on care homes in Scotland.

In 2021 the Inquiry investigated several boarding schools for child abuse including some of Scotland's most famous private schools - Fettes College, Gordonstoun, Loretto, Merchiston Castle, Morrison's Academy (when it was a boarding school), Keil School and Queen Victoria School.

The Inquiry has not investigated the Crown Office and the prosecution of child abuse and has not indicated that the Crown Office will be investigated. The Inquiry has not investigated the success of the current redress scheme.

Residential care establishments for children run by Catholic Orders

Daughters of Charity of St. Vincent de Paul orphanages, Smyllum Park and Bellevue

In October 2018 the Scottish Child Abuse Inquiry issued a report that dealt mainly with children in the care of Smyllum Park orphanage, Lanark (1864-1981) and Bellevue Children's Home, Rutherglen (1912-1961) run by the Daughters of Charity of St. Vincent de Paul .  Children were abused sexually and beaten with leather straps, hairbrushes and crucifixes.  The children experienced "no love, no compassion, no dignity and no comfort."  The inquiry report states that, for example:Children were sexually abused in Smyllum. Children were sexually abused by priests, a trainee priest, Sisters, members of staff and a volunteer.
There was also problematic sexual behaviour by other children.
Children were physically abused. They were hit with and without implements, either in an excess of punishment or for reasons which the child could not fathom.
The implements used included leather straps, the "Lochgelly Tawse," hairbrushes, sticks, footwear, rosary beads, wooden crucifixes and a dog's lead.
For some children, being hit was a normal aspect of daily life.
The physical punishments meted out to children went beyond what was acceptable at the time whether as punishment in schools or in the home.
Children who were bed-wetters were abused physically and emotionally.
They were beaten, put in cold baths and humiliated in ways that included "wearing" their wet sheets and being subjected to hurtful name-calling by Sisters and by other children.
Many children were force-fed.
The Daughters of Charity responded that the events and practices described were not in accordance with their values, and that they would give the report "our utmost attention". They apologised to anyone who suffered abuse while in their care.

In August 2018 police arrested and charged nuns and other former staff of Smyllum Park, eleven women and a man (later increased to 17), regarding alleged child physical and sexual abuse. About 11,600 children passed through Smyllum and a single mass grave near the home contained the bodies of up to 400 children.

Fort Augustus Abbey School, Inverness and Carlekemp Priory School, North Berwick 
Fort Augustus Abbey School and Carlekemp Priory were run by Benedictine monks.

Lady Smith concluded: "Children were sexually abused at both schools. A number of monks were serial sexual predators and, because of the movement of monks between Fort Augustus and Carlekemp, they were able to target victims at both schools. Children were cruelly beaten by sadistic monks at both schools, and some beatings had sexual overtones. Children were humiliated and punished inappropriately and excessively. Some children complained to monks in positions of responsibility about being abused. They received either non-existent or inadequate responses."

A representative of the Benedictine monks order gace an "unreserved apology" to everyone affected by the abuse.

In 2013 the BBC broadcast a documentary called "Sins of our fathers" about the Fort Augustus Abbey School.  They described it as uncovering "...the shocking truth of physical and sexual abuse at one of Scotland's most prestigious Catholic boarding schools..." Five former pupils at Carlekemp Priory School in North Berwick and Fort Augustus Abbey said in this documentary that they were raped by Father Aidan Duggan between 1953 and 1974 when they were young boys. Duggan died in Australia in 2004.

Father Denis Alexander, who had emigrated to Australia, in 2021 pleaded guilty to two charges of lewd, indecent and libidinous practices against two boys at Fort Augustus between 1973 and 1976 and was jailed for four years and five months.  Father Michael "Benedict" Seed a former teacher at Fort Augustus, was found guilty of assaulting one child at the school during the 1970s. Five other charges against him were not proven. Father Robert MacKenzie, who had emigrated to Canada, was extradited from Canada to Scotland in 2020 at the age of 87 to face 14 charges of sexual and physical abuse of young boys at Fort Augustus and Carlekemp. These charges were later dropped.

Carlekemp was closed in 1977 and Fort Augustus in 1993.

Marist Brothers Schools St Joseph's College, Dumfries and St Columba's College, Largs 
Between 1951 and 1980 children in the care of St. Joseph's College and St. Columba's College suffered abuse that was "shocking and distressing" according to Lady Smith.  She said "Both schools had flawed systems that allowed abusers driven by sexual motives to have easy access to children in their care" and "Marist Brothers in positions of trust at both boarding schools violated their monastic vows and breached the trust of children and their families."  Lady Smith found staff at St. Columba's were serial sex offenders.

In 2019 a former teacher, Peter Toner, was jailed for sexually abusing five children at St. Columba's.  Another teacher, Brother Germanus Paul (David McKell) was also identified by Lady Smith as an abuser of children.  In 1998 former teacher Norman Bulloch was found not guilty of abusing a pupil at the St. Columba's College between 1971 and 1972. However, in 2001 Bulloch was found guilty of the sexual assault of two boys at St Joseph's College between 1972 and 1976 and was jailed for 8 years.

A spokesman for the Marist Brothers said "The Marist Brothers are deeply sorry for the pain and hurt caused to all those who were abused by Marist Brothers, and to others who were affected by the abuse. "We offer our unreserved apology. The Marist Brothers recognise the courage of those who came forward and hope that the inquiry's report brings recognition of their suffering and loss."

Dumfries council took over St. Joseph's college in 1981 and the Marist Brothers closed the St. Columba's College in 1982.

Sisters of Nazareth Houses in Aberdeen, Cardonald, Lasswade and Kilmarnock 
The Inquiry found in their report that, between 1933 and 1984, children who had been in the care of Sisters of Nazareth orphanages had encountered sexual abuse "of the utmost depravity."

The Sisters of Nazareth said “As we have said before, we apologise wholeheartedly and unreservedly to those who suffered any form of mistreatment."

St. Ninian's, Falkland 
Lady Smith's report concluded that St. Ninian's (a residential school run by the Congregation of Christian Brothers, a Catholic organisation) was "a place of abuse and deprivation" particularly from 1969 until the school closed in 1983.   The Christian Brothers were able to "pursue their abusive practices with impunity" and the evidence against them was  "shocking and distressing." Children in care suffered sexual, physical and emotional abuse.

Michael Madigan, a representative for the Christian Brothers said the congregation acknowledged with ‘deepest regret’ that children had been abused.

Two teachers, Paul Kelly and former headmaster John Farrell, at the school were convicted in 2016 for abusing boys in their care and sentenced to ten years and five years in jail. A third monk, Brother Ryan, had already died in 2013 and could not be tried.   In 2022 a former pupil (called AB in the court) was awarded a £1.4 million in damages for the abuse he suffered from these monks at the school.  AB described how he had been beaten, raped and molested by Kelly, Farrell and Ryan, and forced to watch other children being abused. The three Christian Brothers often used a dormitory called the "Favourite boys room" where children could be heard screaming while they were being abused.

Michael Murphy, a former monk at St. Ninian's and St. Joseph's school in Tranent, was convicted in 2021 of a further 29 offences against boys at these schools between 1961 and 1981.   Murphy subjected boys, some as young as seven or eight, to electric shocks, and brutal beatings and whippings. One victim described how Murphy pushed him into a hole filled with urine and excrement. Another said Murphy made him eat his own vomit. One more victim reported that Murphy crushed his hand and little finger in a vice.  This later caused gangrene and the finger had to be partially amputated.

Dave Sharp, a survivor who gave evidence during this case study has been critical of the study outlining that he was prevented from giving evidence about being trafficked as a child. There have been reports of Sexual abuse cases in the Congregation of Christian Brothers in Australia, Canada, England, Ireland and the USA.

Residential child care establishments run by non-religious and voluntary organisations

Aberlour Child Care Trust 
Aberlour was also reported by the Inquiry to be a child care institution where children suffered physical, emotional and sexual abuse.

Sally Ann Kelly, the chief executive of Aberlour, said ""We welcome today's interim findings from Lady Smith and wish to again reiterate our unreserved apology to those who suffered abuse while in the care of Aberlour."

Barnardo's homes, Tyneholm, Balcary, Glasclune and Craigerne 
The Inquiry concluded in their report that children in care of Barnardo's homes at Tyneholm, Balcary, Glasclune and Craigerne in Scotland  in the 1950s and 1960s suffered emotional, sexual and physical abuse.

Martin Crewe, the head of Barnardo's Scotland said in 2020: "We absolutely apologise for what happened to those individuals. Any instance of abuse is absolutely unacceptable.”

Quarriers Homes, Inverclyde 
Quarriers Homes were summarised in the Inquiry's report as institutions where children in their care suffered physical, emotional and sexual abuse. Lady Smith said of the children that "scant regard was paid to their dignity".and they lived in "harsh, rigid regimes."

Quarriers also said that their former policy of sending children abroad was "misguided and wrong." The chief executive of Quarriers, Alice Harper, apologised and sad "Vulnerable children were sent away and we recognise that some also suffered physical and emotional abuse, including sexual abuse."

Boarding schools

Fettes College, Edinburgh 
Fettes College accepted that one of its teachers in the Junior school sexually molested young boys in the 1970s and admitted liability.  After refusing to prosecute the individual until January 2021, the Scottish Crown Office and Procurator Fiscal Service later in 2021 agreed to seek his extradition from South Africa where he was then living. One former pupil was awarded $450,000 in damages in 2022 for abuse suffered at the school.

Gordonstoun, Elgin 
The enquiry found 82 cases of bullying and 11 alleged incidents of abuse at Gordonstoun.  One girl described how she had been raped by an instructor when she was 13.  Another girl was raised 7.7 metres in the air in a bosun's chair on a sailing boat and left there for 2.5 hours.  a male former pupil said he was drugged and assaulted by a teacher when he was 12 at Aberlour (a feeder school for Gordonston). Andrew Keir, a teacher between 1988 and 1991 was convicted of lewd acts with three boys and was jailed for 12 months. Other children described how there was a "culture of fear" because older and stronger boys would attack, torment and abuse the younger children.  There was no help from the school staff. One former pupil said; “No one talked about bullying or pupil to pupil abuse nor did anyone seem concerned about it.” The Principal of the school, Lisa Kerr, said she was shocked to learn that former pupils had been sexually and physically abused while at school and admitted that, in the 1970s-1980s, there had been severe bullying. Some former pupils described incidents of sexual abuse and rape in the decades up to the 1980s. Kerr said "It's been devastating to see the impact of abuse at Gordonstoun has had on them."

Keil School, Dumbarton 
At the time of the inquiry Scottish Police were investigating  three former teachers at Keil School for abusing children.  A teacher of drama and English who taught in the late 1980s and 1990s (he had been jailed for sexual abusing a boy at a previous English school), another teacher who was at the school from 1991 to 1997 (who committed suicide after being accused) and a third teacher who was there from 1991 to 1997.  The school acknowledged that there had been child abuse at the school from 1997 to 2000.

The school closed in July 2000.

Loretto, Musselburgh 
Loretto school admitted that pupils were sexually, physically and emotionally abused by Guy Ray-Hills a French teacher in the 1950s and 1960s. By the time of the enquiry in 2021 Ray-Hills had died. 

David Stock, a former teacher at Loretto described a horrifying culture of sexual and physical abuse by older bullies at the school on younger pupils in the 1980s and early 1990s.  When he brought this to the attention of the school authorities they dismissed them.  The school responded: "...To anyone who suffered abuse while attending Loretto, we deeply regret the distress caused and offer an unreserved apology."

Merchiston Castle, Edinburgh 
Former pupils at Merchiston described how life for children there was akin to "Lord of the Flies" with vicious beatings and improper touching by some staff.  One housemaster, James Rainy Brown, was reported as watching first year boys sit naked in a bath of cold water as their punishment (Brown later committed suicide while being investigated by the police). Another teacher named Edward had a reputation for inappropriately touching boys after punishment or after an injury at sports - described by one as “Usually when he had caned boys he would massage them, then have a feel around...."  Other comments were "You had to accept there was a form of corruption and basically the school would behave in whatever manner pleased it...” and (talking about bullying) that staff did “nothing whatsoever” to help pupils.

A lawyer for Merchiston Castle school said at the inquiry that "it was clear with at least one former member of staff the dots were never to be joined. The school profoundly regrets and sincerely apologises for the fact that such experiences were endured by some pupils."  He offered an "unreserved apology" on behalf of the school. The headmaster,Jonathan Anderson admitted that there had been abuse at the school between 1930 and 2014. However Anderson said it was "not fair" to single out boys schools as a "predatory culture" was an issue for all schools.

Morrison's Academy, Crieff 
Former pupils at the school described how teachers took"delight" in caning children.  One ex-pupil described how,when he was 12 or 13, his wrist was broken because of the savage beating he got from a teacher.

Morrisons apologised to former pupils who, from the 1950s - 1990s, had been emotionally and physically abused at the school.

Queen Victoria School, Dunblane 
A lawyer representing the school apologised and expressed deep regret to former pupils who had been abused.  One former pupil said, that when he was 13, he was physically and sexually abused by an older boy at the school.  He reported this to the headmaster who did nothing and he was afterwards subjected to even more vicious bullying and sexual abuse. He was not supported by teachers who ostracised him. The school admitted that abuse had occurred.

Criticism

Limited scope of investigations 
Abuse survivors have called on the Scottish Child Abuse Inquiry remit to be widened out to include victims who were targeted outwith residential care. Lady Smith rejected this request.

Survivors of child abuse have criticised the Inquiry for not investigating sports and leisure clubs or faith based organisations attended on a day-to-day basis. In 2016, Kezia Dugdale the Scottish Labour Leader at the time, called on the Inquiry to be expanded to include football in light of the evidence of attacks on young players, stating unless the remit of the Scottish Child Abuse Inquiry was widened, the majority of abuse survivors would be “denied justice”. Nicola Sturgeon refused to expand the Inquiry because it would take too long to conclude its investigations. Other similar Inquiries have had wider terms of reference to include sport such as the Royal Commission into Institutional Responses to Child Sexual Abuse and have concluded in a shorter time than the Scottish Child Abuse Inquiry.

Survivors of child abuse were ignored when they called for the Inquiry to investigate all allegations of organised abuse and paedophile rings outside of residential care. Graeme Pearson Labour's justice spokesman said there should have been an investigation as to why the child abuse allegations against Tory MP Nicholas Fairbairn and barrister Robert Henderson QC were dropped by police, stating "Given the new knowledge we have of the powerful people involved in some of these cases, I think the time is right to revisit this and get a clear understanding of what went on and to ask if [the case] was abandoned, was it abandoned for the right reasons?"

A survivor has criticised an Inquiry report as a 'cover up' as he was not allowed to give evidence about being trafficked to Ireland while in care. Mr Sharp said: “There's no mention of being taken over to Ireland, despite lots of men coming forward and saying the same thing happened to them.

Petition to include state schools in the Inquiry was rejected 
In 2019, a petition was made to the Scottish Parliament by Maryanne Pugsley. Ms Pugsley said she wanted to raise the issue after she was "sexually and emotionally abused by a teacher in a state school in Scotland". The petition also seeks a review of the law of corroboration because of the difficulties facing victims who raise historic cases of abuse. Ms Pugsley said: "I have concerns over Scotland's independent inquiry into the abuse of children in care, which currently excludes the victims of historical abuse in state schools in Scotland. I believe this disservice repudiates a fundamental right of the victims of child sexual abuse and of the subsequent repercussions in relation to the safeguarding of our children within state schools. The discrimination against the victims of historical childhood abuse within state schools being excluded from the current in care inquiry into child abuse is unfair."

Mounting costs 
In July 2021, it was reported by The Times that the Inquiry costs had soared to more than £33,000 a day with the total approaching £50 million. The inquiry cost more than £3 million between 1 April 2021 and 30 June 2021, despite not sitting since 27 May 2021. By comparison for cost, the completed Royal Commission into Institutional Responses to Child Sexual Abuse was a total of AUD$372 million for a much wider terms of reference including child abuse outside residential care and covering the whole of Australia. The cost of the incomplete Scottish Inquiry on 31 December 2021 was £51,655,410. By 31 December 2021, the cost per head of the population for the complete Australian Inquiry with final recommendations was approximately £7.5 per head of population whilst the incomplete Scottish Inquiry with narrower terms of reference and continued rising costs was £9.5 per head of population.

Slow pace of Inquiry 
The Inquiry was set up on 1 October 2015, over 6 years ago. A transcript contract extension indicates the Inquiry hearings could run until February 2025, with a possible extension to February 2026. Then the report would need to be written. Another similar but much larger Inquiry, the Royal Commission into Institutional Responses to Child Sexual Abuse completed the hearings and final report in just 5 years.

Lack of open justice 
On 23 February 2022, an appeal court ruled Lady Smith was found to be acting beyond her powers to prevent the BBC from fully reporting a £2.6m legal claim against Scotland's child abuse inquiry. The legal claim against Smith was an allegation of discrimination and harassment by Smith against the lead Junior Council of the Inquiry. This claim was later withdrawn partially due to potential legal costs. Smith issued an order as the Chair of the Inquiry restricting media reporting the employment claim. This was challenged by the BBC and subsequently found to be unlawful.

Investigation of the Crown Office 
On 7 May 2019, it was reported that the Crown Office said it anticipates to be investigated by the Inquiry. By March 2022, the Crown Office has not been identified as an institution for investigation. The 2019 disclosure from the Crown office came after a lawyer appointed to the inquiry brought up concerns that young people in care were being let down by a prosecution policy that did not capture sexual exploitation through prostitution. Other similar Inquiries such as the Royal Commission into Institutional Responses to Child Sexual Abuse have investigated prosecution and the decisions made in relation to prosecution of child sexual assault.

Scottish Government interference 
In June 2016, Professor Michael Lamb, a key member of the panel resigned due to government interference. Susan O'Brien QC, the former Chair of the inquiry resigned, stating that her position has been “actively undermined” by officials.

Other similar child abuse investigations 
In the wake of the  Jimmy Savile sexual abuse scandal an investigation was set up in 2014 by the then British Home Secretary Theresa May into how the institutions in England and Wales handled their duty of care to protect children from sexual abuse.  This was called the Independent Inquiry into Child Sexual Abuse and was still ongoing in 2022.

The Northern Ireland Historical Institutional Abuse Inquiry was described in a 2014 BBC article as "the biggest child abuse public inquiry ever held in the UK" and investigated historical institutional sexual and physical abuse of children in Northern Ireland.  It ran from 2014 to 2016 and covered institutions in Northern Ireland that provided residential care for children from 1922 to 1995 but excluded most church-run schools.

In 1995 the Australian government started an inquiry into the treatment of Aboriginal children.  In 1997 they issued the Report of the National Inquiry into the Separation of Aboriginal and Torres Strait Islander Children from Their Families (Bringing them home) - sometimes known as the "Stolen Generations" controversy. A second Australian inquiry was the Royal Commission into Institutional Responses to Child Sexual Abuse which ran from 2013 to 2017.  It investigated instances and allegations of child sexual abuse in Australia.

The Commission to Inquire into Child Abuse (the Ryan Commission) was established in Ireland in 2000 to investigate physical, sexual and emotional abuse and neglect in "a school, an industrial school, a reformatory school, an orphanage, a hospital, a children's home and any other place where children are cared for other than as members of their families."

The Truth and Reconciliation Commission of Canada was started in 2008 and between 2009 and 2015 it documented the history and lasting impacts of the Canadian Indian residential school system on Indigenous students and their families.  The final report in 2015 concluded that the school system (of which 70% was administered by Catholic schools and the remainder by schools of other religious denominations) amounted to cultural genocide. The Canadian National Centre for Truth and Reconciliation, set up in 2007 at the University of Manitoba in Winnipeg, is the repository for material collected by the Truth and Reconciliation Commission of Canada.

References

External links
  

2015 establishments in Scotland
2017 in Scotland
Child abuse in Scotland